Ezekiel Sims is a fictional character appearing in American comic books published by Marvel Comics, usually as a supporting character in stories featuring Spider-Man.

Publication history
Ezekiel first appeared in The Amazing Spider-Man vol. 2 #30 and was created by J. Michael Straczynski and John Romita Jr.

Fictional character biography
Ezekiel Sims was a rich businessman who, in his younger years, ritualistically gained powers similar to those of Spider-Man. He wanted to use his powers to be a hero, but initially used them to found a corporation, believing that he could not do anything without a base of operations, and swiftly became too busy to use his powers on a daily basis. When Spider-Man emerged, Ezekiel hired half a dozen independent private detectives to investigate Spider-Man's life, allowing him to piece together who Spider-Man was from the various pieces of information they provided to him. Felicia Hardy was one of his investigators, specifically hired to track Spider-Man's appearances in foreign countries.

Ezekiel, in his 50s, contacted Spider-Man and explained to him the nature of animal totems: people who gain supernatural abilities from a mystic link with certain animals. He suggested that the spider that bit Peter Parker was not mutated by the radiation, but actually trying to give Peter its powers before the radiation killed it. This meant that Spider-Man was now part of the supernatural food chain, and became a target for other totems and beings who feed on totems (Hence why so many of Spider-Man's foes were based on animals; on some level, they 'sensed' that Peter was a true totem while they were merely impostors and were thus driven to destroy him). He subsequently aided Spider-Man in fighting a being known as Morlun, a vampire-like entity that 'fed' on totems, apparently at the cost of his life, but it was later revealed that he survived and departed for Africa, where he aided Spider-Man in dealing with Shathra, another supernatural-based menace, by leading Peter to an area where he would have the advantage over Shathra.

It was revealed that a variety of supernatural menaces that Spider-Man had faced were really after Ezekiel, and Ezekiel attempted to direct the consequences of gaining his powers onto Spider-Man himself, taking Spider-Man to the temple where he had been given his powers and drawing blood to attract a massive spider that would take the 'false' totem warrior as a sacrifice. However, in his last moments, he realized that he had done nothing with his powers but help himself, while Peter had selflessly risked his life to save others again and again. With this in mind, he attacked the spider that would have eaten Peter, giving his own life to save his friend in recognition of the hero that Peter truly was, and thus gaining a chance for redemption that he would have never had again.

In Grim Hunt, it appeared as if a reanimated Ezekiel (covered in spiders) appeared before Spider-Man and Arachne. Unknown to Spider-Man, the Ezekiel that appeared before him was really the Chameleon in disguise leading Spider-Man into a trap with the Kravinoffs in order to carry out the resurrection of Sergei Kravinoff, which required the blood of Spider-Man.

During the Original Sin storyline following the murder of Uatu the Watcher, Spider-Man's exposure to Uatu's eye during the confrontation with the Orb revealed that Cindy Moon, the second person bitten by the radioactive spider that created Spider-Man, had been held in isolation by Ezekiel who gave her some training in her powers but then kept her locked in a secret room underneath his office.  He also appeared to her and Spider-Man in the form of a prerecorded message telling Silk that if she leaves the lair, there is no hope for them all (likely referring to the Spider-Totems). It is also revealed that Ezekiel had kept Silk safe in her lair to prevent Morlun from finding out. Years later, Spider-Man learns about Silk and frees her from Ezekiel's bunker, allowing her to start a new life and career. This ends up triggering the multiversal hunt of all spiders as the Inheritors are now aware of Silk's existence as the "Bride".

Powers and abilities
Ezekiel possesses a number of superhuman attributes that are almost identical to those naturally possessed by Spider-Man. His strength, speed, stamina, agility, reaction time, and resistance to physical injury are all enhanced to superhuman levels. Although Ezekiel is of an advanced age, none of his physical attributes have declined over the decades.

Ezekiel also possesses the ability to stick to most surfaces and crawl along them in the same way as Spider-Man. He also possesses a type of E.S.P. that serves as an early warning system in much the same way as Spider-Man's spider-sense, although his was not as developed as Spider-Man's. Because of their nearly identical powers, Ezekiel and Spider-Man are immune to each other's early warning system.

In addition to his powers, Ezekiel is extremely wealthy and is a highly skilled businessman and owner of a company with international connections. As with Spider-Man, he is a formidable hand-to-hand combatant though he has had no formal training. He uses a unique type of freestyle fighting that allows him to make full use of his powers. He does not seem to have any web-generating devices like Spider-Man's web-shooters, and is never seen to produce any webbing naturally. In his conversations with Peter Parker, the subject never comes up. He is knowledgeable of the mystical nature of totems, and once told Peter the legend of the first "Spider-Man".

Reception
 In 2022, Screen Rant ranked Ezekiel Sims 8th in their "10 Most Powerful Silk Villains In Marvel Comics" list.

Other versions

Spider-Verse
During the "Spider-Verse" storyline, different versions of Ezekiel are featured:

 One of the Spider-Men recruited to fight the Inheritors is the "Old Man Spider" of Earth-4 who wears a similar outfit to the Spider-Man of Earth-312500 (as seen in "The Amazing Spider-Man" #500). After being fatally injured by Daemos of the Inheritors, the "Old Man Spider-Man" is revealed to be an alternate Ezekiel who took up the Spider-Man identity after his version of Peter was killed by Morlun. Before succumbing to his wounds, Ezekiel implores the Spider-Man of Earth-616 to protect "the Bride, the Other, and the Scion".
 The Earth-3145 version of Ezekiel approached Ben Parker (who had retired from being Spider-Man after Aunt May and Peter were killed by the Emerald Elf) and informed Ben about the imminent arrival of Morlun to kill him. With nothing left, Ben accepted Ezekiel's offer and was maintained in a secret bunker in Sims Tower even after New York City was destroyed in a nuclear holocaust caused by one of Doctor Octopus' blackmail schemes going horribly wrong.

In other media

Video games
 Ezekiel appears as a playable character in Spider-Man Unlimited.

References

External links
 Ezekiel at Marvel.com
 Ezekiel at Marvel Wiki
 Ezekiel at Comic Vine
 Ezekiel's Profile at Spiderfan.org

Marvel Comics superheroes
Fictional businesspeople
Fictional characters with superhuman durability or invulnerability
Marvel Comics mutates
Marvel Comics characters who can move at superhuman speeds
Marvel Comics characters with superhuman strength
Comics characters introduced in 2001
Spider-Man characters
Characters created by John Romita Jr.
Characters created by J. Michael Straczynski

it:Ezekiel (personaggio)